The Nature Exchange is a specialized learning environment that encourages people to explore nature and actively observe, collect, study and share the world around them. It is a turn-key exhibit, now used in nature-based institutions around North America. Developed by Science North and AldrichPears Associates, the Nature Exchange is an interactive forum where visitors trade ethically collected natural objects and information about them to learn and engage with the natural world. Visitors earn points for each trade, based on criteria such as quality, rarity and their knowledge of the item. Science centers, nature centers and zoos use Nature Exchanges to raise awareness of key issues in the natural world, and, through personal interaction, changes attitudes and behavior.

Locations
Telus World of Science - Edmonton, Edmonton, Alberta
Canadian Bushplane Heritage Centre, Sault Ste. Marie, Ontario
Chattahoochee Nature Center, Roswell, Georgia
BC Wildlife Park, Kamloops, British Columbia
Las Vegas Springs Preserve, Nevada
Zoomazium, Woodland Park Zoo – Seattle, Washington - CLOSED
Tulsa Zoo, Tulsa, Oklahoma
Kidspace Children's Museum, Pasadena, California
Exploration Place – Prince George, British Columbia
Lacerte Family Children's Zoo, Dallas Zoo, Dallas, Texas
Science North, Sudbury, Ontario
Santa Barbara Museum of Natural History, Santa Barbara, California
John P. McGovern Children's Zoo, Houston Zoo, Houston, Texas
Dynamic Earth, Sudbury, Ontario
Roper Mountain Science Center, Greenville, South Carolina

References

External links 
Science North
AldrichPears Associates
The Nature Exchange

Museum education
Science education
Environmental education